The 1983 European Figure Skating Championships was a senior-level international competition held in Dortmund, West Germany from February 1 to 6, 1983. Elite skaters from European ISU member nations competed in the disciplines of men's singles, ladies' singles, pair skating, and ice dancing.

Overview and results
The championships cost 1.5 million Deutsche Marks. Compulsory figures were held in Unna and began at 8 a.m. The German Ice Skating Union president Wolf-Dieter Montag, also served as president of the organizing committee.

Men
Simond won compulsory figures. After the short program, Sabovčík was in first, followed by Schramm and Simond. Schramm would win the title.

Ladies

Pairs
Baeß / Thierbach repeated as European champions.

Ice dancing

References

External links
 results

European Figure Skating Championships, 1983
European Figure Skating Championships, 1983
European Figure Skating Championships
Figure skating in West Germany
Sports competitions in Dortmund
20th century in Dortmund
1980s in North Rhine-Westphalia
February 1983 sports events in Europe